The Nomenclature of Territorial Units for Statistics (NUTS) is a geocode standard for referencing the subdivisions of Cyprus for statistical purposes. The standard is developed and regulated by the European Union. The NUTS standard is instrumental in delivering the European Union's Structural Funds. The NUTS code for Cyprus is CY and a hierarchy of three levels is established by Eurostat. Cyprus does not have subdivisions covered by the NUTS levels, as the population is small enough to be covered in one level. Below these is a further levels of geographic organisation - the local administrative unit (LAU). In Cyprus, the LAU 1 is districts and the LAU 2 is municipalities.

Overall and NUTS codes

Local administrative units

Below the NUTS levels, the two LAU (Local Administrative Units) levels are:

The LAU codes of Cyprus can be downloaded here: ''

See also
 Subdivisions of Cyprus
 ISO 3166-2 codes of Cyprus
 FIPS region codes of Cyprus

References

Sources
 Hierarchical list of the Nomenclature of territorial units for statistics - NUTS and the Statistical regions of Europe
 Overview map of EU Countries - NUTS level 1
 KYPROS / KIBRIS - NUTS level 2
 KYPROS / KIBRIS - NUTS level 3
 Correspondence between the NUTS levels and the national administrative units
 List of current NUTS codes
 Download current NUTS codes (ODS format)

Cyprus
Nuts